the7stars is a media agency based in the United Kingdom. Clients include Iceland, Warner Music, Ladbrokes Coral Group, Nintendo and Suzuki. In 2017, Campaign Magazine ranked the7stars the 12th biggest media agency in Britain.

History
the7stars was established in 2005, by Jenny Biggam, Mark Jarvis, and Colin Mills, along with a group of senior management from media agency Carat UK, who founded the organisation to compete with independent media agencies. The marketplace had been slow to develop due to prohibitively high start-up costs; the funding required for the creation of the agency came from private individuals, rather than from "venture capitalists or a media network", making the7stars the first  planning agency to launch since Christine Walker set up Walker Media in 1997".

In 2009, the7stars conducted research on the effect the global economic downturn had on media consumption in the UK. It was reported that older consumers had stated that, if prices increased, 46 percent would stop buying newspapers. There was also an overall increase in expectation for media such as newspapers to be free and freely available. In August 2016, Bauer Media appointed the7stars as media agency.

Clients
Since starting out with a focus on music labels, the7stars has grown to cover a variety of sectors including retail, charity, technology, finance, gaming and gambling. Clients now include Suzuki, Save the Children, HMV, Iceland and Nintendo amongst others.

Awards

In 2015, the7stars won both Campaign and Media Week's 'Media Agency of the Year' award. In 2016, they placed 4th on The Sunday Times' '100 Best Small Companies to Work For'.

References

Advertising agencies of the United Kingdom
Mass media companies of the United Kingdom
Marketing companies established in 2005